DWBG-TV, channel 7, is a commercial television station owned by GMA Network Inc. Its transmitter is located at Brgy. Lusuac, Peñarrubia, Abra. This station currently carries the signal of GMA Dagupan via GMA Ilocos.

Currently aired program
One North Central Luzon (Formerly as Balitang Amianan) - flagship afternoon newscast (simulcast on TV-10 Dagupan)
Mornings with GMA Regional TV - flagship morning newscast (simulcast on GMA TV-10 Dagupan)

Previously programs
Balitang Ilokano
24 Oras Ilokano

NOTE: 24 Oras Ilokano (previously known as Balitang Ilokano) is simulcast via GMA Ilocos, which covers Ilocos provinces, Abra and parts of La Union.

See also 
D-5-AS-TV
DWBC-TV
DWGD-TV
List of GMA Network stations

References

GMA Network stations
Television channels and stations established in 1979